Synchiropus grinnelli, the Philippines dragonet, is a species of fish in the family Callionymidae, the dragonets. It is found in the Western Central Pacific from Philippines to Indonesia.

Etymology
The fish is named in honor of Joseph Grinnell (1877-1939), who was Director of the Museum of Vertebrate Zoology, University of California  in Berkeley, California.

References

grinnelli
Fish of the Pacific Ocean
Fish of East Asia
Taxa named by Henry Weed Fowler
Fish described in 1941